The Montreal Montagnards were an early amateur ice hockey team in Canada, organized in the early 1900s. The club is notable as one of the first teams made up of francophone players, the sport having been dominated until that time by players of English or Scottish descent.

History

The Montagnards were founded around 1900. They were an intermediate team in the Canadian Amateur Hockey League (CAHL) from 1900 until 1902.

The Montagnards were a member of the Federal Amateur Hockey League (FAHL), set up as a rival to the CAHL from 1904 until 1908. The club had little success in its first two seasons. In 1904 they played as a merged team with the Montreal Le National team. In 1906–07, the Montagnards were leading the FAHL league, but after the Cornwall team used two professionals from the Montreal Shamrocks, the club protested the game. The protest was lost and the Montagnards resigned from the league to protect their amateur status. The team would return to the league for one final season, the next season. At the end of the 1907–08 FAHL season, the FAHL became a professional league and the Montagnards left the league to continue as an amateur team. The team continued play in various Quebec leagues, including the Montreal City Senior Hockey League.

Notable players
 Ed Millaire - later played for the Montreal Canadiens

See also
 Montreal Le National

References

Canadian Amateur Hockey League teams
Defunct ice hockey teams in Canada
Federal Amateur Hockey League teams
Ice hockey teams in Montreal